Ian Inkster (born 4 August 1949) is a global historian, author and columnist. He is professor of international history at Nottingham Trent University, a prolific writer, editor of the History of Technology book series since 2002 and frequent contributor to Taiwan's Taipei Times, and South China Morning Post. Beginning in the early 1970s, he has written many books and articles on the influence of scientific and technological change on the course of global history since the 18th century, with particular focus on the UK and Japan, and is a frequent commentator on international relations.

Life
Born in Warrington, England, raised in Khartoum, Edinburgh, Lowestoft, and Harlow, educated in England, he has had university faculty positions in UK, Australia, Japan, and Taiwan. He is married with five adult children, and alternates between living in Bloomsbury, London and in L’Escala (Spain), residing and working in Taiwan.

Works

Books 
 Inkster, Ian (2001) 
 Inkster, Ian and Bryson, M. (1999) Industrial man. The life and works of Charles Sylvester, engineer, 1776–1828. Salt Lake City: Jackpot Books.
 Inkster, Ian (1998) Technology and industrialisation: historical case studies and international perspectives. Aldershot: Ashgate.
 Inkster, Ian (1997) Scientific culture and urbanisation in industrialising Britain. London: Ashgate. (Variorum Collected Studies Series)
 Inkster, Ian (1991) Clever city: Japan, Australia and the Multifunction Polis. Sydney University Press.
 Inkster, Ian (1991) 
 Inkster, Ian (1982) Science, public science and science policy in Australia circa, 1880s-1916. Canberra: Basser Library, Australian Academy of Science.
 Inkster, Ian (1981) Science, technology and the late development effect. Tokyo: Institute of Developing Economies. (V.R.F. series, no. 84)
 Inkster, Ian (1980) Japan as a development model? Relative backwardness and technological transfer. Bochum: Brockmeyer.

See also

List of University of London people
List of historians

External links 
 University of London profile
 Podcast: Iain Inkster interviewed on Chairman Mao's legacy

English historians
Living people
Academics of Nottingham Trent University
People from Warrington
1949 births